David Jimenez (April 5, 1939 – October 20, 2013) was a Puerto Rican American professional golfer.

Jimenez was a native of Puerto Rico and played in the golf World Cup between 1963 and 1973. Later he represented the United States in the 1976 PGA Cup. He was runner-up in the 1975 PGA Professional National Championship, losing in a playoff to Roger Watson.

Jimenez was a regular player in the early years of the European Seniors Tour from its founding in 1992. He was twice runner-up, to Brian Huggett in the 1992 Northern Electric Seniors and to Tommy Horton in the 1993 Senior Zurich Lexus Trophy, losing both events in a playoff.

He died of Alzheimer's disease in 2013 at the age of 74.

Team appearances
World Cup (representing Puerto Rico): 1963, 1964, 1967, 1968, 1972, 1973
PGA Cup (representing the United States): 1976

See also
1966 PGA Tour Qualifying School graduates

References

External links

Puerto Rican male golfers
American male golfers
European Senior Tour golfers
Neurological disease deaths in Georgia (U.S. state)
Deaths from Alzheimer's disease
1939 births
2013 deaths